Ahmadabad (also Romanized as Aḩmadābād; also known as Aḩmadābād-e Dastgerdān) is a village in Dastgerdan Rural District, Dastgerdan District, Tabas County, South Khorasan Province, Iran. At the 2006 census, its population was 47, in 21 families.

References 

Populated places in Tabas County